Vladimer Barkaia (29 July 1937 – 30 December 2022) was a Soviet footballer from Georgia who played as a striker.

Career 
Born in Gagra, Barkaia played for FC Burevestnik Gagra from 1953 to 1955 and Dinamo Tbilisi from 1957 to 1967. During his career in FC Dinamo Tbilisi, Barkaia played 226 matches and scored 68 goals. Barkaya made his debut for USSR on 27 June 1965 in a 1966 FIFA World Cup qualifier against Denmark and scored twice on his debut. He also played in a friendly against Brazil team starring Pelé. He was an assistant coach for Dinamo Tbilisi from 1968 to 1969. He also graduated from the Tbilisi State University with a degree in Economics in 1963.

Personal life and death 
Barkaia died on 30 December 2022, at the age of 85.

Honours
 Soviet Top League winner: 1964.

Awards 
 Master of Sports, USSR, 1959
 Order of Honor, Georgia, 1997
 Knight of Sports, Georgia, 2014

References

External links
  Profile

1937 births
2022 deaths
Footballers from Georgia (country)
Soviet footballers
Soviet Union international footballers
Soviet Top League players
FC Dinamo Tbilisi players
Association football forwards
Tbilisi State University alumni
People from Gagra
Recipients of the Order of Honor (Georgia)